Trotsville is a township of Wolmaransstad, in North West province of South Africa.

References

Populated places in the Maquassi Hills Local Municipality